A total eclipse of the Moon occurs on Wednesday June 9, 2123, with maximum eclipse at 05:06 UT. A dramatic total eclipse lasting 106 minutes and 6 seconds will plunge the full Moon into deep darkness, as it passes right through the centre of the Earth's umbral shadow. While the visual effect of a total eclipse is variable, the Moon may be stained a deep orange or red colour at maximum eclipse. This will be a great spectacle for everyone who sees it. The partial eclipse will last for 3 hours and 56 minutes in total. The penumbral eclipse lasts for 6 hours and 14 minutes. Maximum eclipse is at 05:06:28 UT. This will be the longest Total Lunar Eclipse since 16 July 2000 (106 minutes, 25 seconds), and the longest one until 12 May 2264 (106 minutes, 13 seconds) and 27 July 3107 (106 minutes, 21 seconds), though the eclipse on June 19, 2141 will be nearly identical in all aspects. This will also be the longest of the 22nd century and the second longest of the 3rd millennium. The eclipse on June 19, 2141 will be the second longest of the 22nd century and the third longest of the third millennium (at 106 minutes 5 seconds).

Related lunar eclipses 

Lunar eclipses are related by many different eclipse cycles. The Saros cycle (18 years and 10 days) repeats the most consistently due three coinciding periods, and continue over 70 events (1200+ years). Eclipses are identified by a Saros number and a member index within each series. The lunar year (354 days) and Metonic cycles (19 years) are short period last only 8 to 10 events. The Metonic cycle is equal to one Saros cycle plus one lunar year, and so the two series progress in parallel. The Inex cycle (29 years minus 20 days) can last tens of thousands of years, so long that long perturbations in the moon's path must be taken into account for prediction. Also the eclipse qualities are less inconsistent because the moon is at different significantly positions in its elliptical orbit in sequential events. Similarly for the shorter Tritos cycle (10 years and 31 days), repeats less consistently for the same reason.

Saros series

Half-Saros cycle
A lunar eclipse will be preceded and followed by solar eclipses by 9 years and 5.5 days (a half saros). This lunar eclipse is related to two total solar eclipses of Solar Saros 139.

References 

Future lunar eclipses
Central total lunar eclipses
22nd-century lunar eclipses